The South African Federation of Trade Unions (SAFTU) was a national trade union federation of workers representing workers in South Africa.

The federation was founded in 1951, as a split from the South African Trades and Labour Council by right-wing unions which accepted apartheid and did not approve of black workers being given a role in governing trade unions.  Some of the unions which split away were restricted to white workers, while others accepted "coloured" or Asian members, but none admitted black workers.

The unions with a mixed membership, such as the South African Typographical Union, soon left to join the new Trade Union Council of South Africa, which similarly did not admit black workers.  In 1957, the federation affiliated to the South African Confederation of Labour (SACOL).  By 1962, it had 11 affiliates, with a total of 66,263 members.  As SACOL became more centralised, SAFTU declined in importance, and it appears to have dissolved around 1980.

References

Apartheid in South Africa
National trade union centres of South Africa
Trade unions established in 1951